Literary Research Guide is a reference work that annotates and evaluates important research materials related to English literature and English literary studies. The first edition appeared in 1989 and the fifth edition was published in 2008. These editions were printed books and the work was digitalized into an electronic version c. 2008.

The latest edition describes its mission as follows: "a selected, annotated guide to reference sources essential to the study of British literature, literatures of the United States, other literatures in English and related topics".

This work won Choice Outstanding Academic Book Award which was given by the Association of College and Research Libraries's review magazine Choice.

The author of the Guide was James L. Harner (died May 2016), an academic at Texas A&M University, who also originally compiled the World Shakespeare Bibliography, which has now been placed online and is the single-largest Shakespeare database in the world.

Bibliography

References

External links 

  Literary Research Guide (5th edition, 2008)

Reference works
Works about literature
Bibliographic databases and indexes
Research
English-language books